Cidália Daniel Cuta (born 27 October 1998), known as Ninika, is a Mozambican footballer who plays as a forward for CD Costa do Sol and the Mozambique women's national team.

Club career
Ninika has played for Costa do Sol in Mozambique.

International career
Ninika capped for Mozambique at senior level during the 2018 and 2021 COSAFA Women's Championships.

References

External links

1998 births
Living people
Sportspeople from Maputo
Mozambican women's footballers
Women's association football forwards
CD Costa do Sol players
Mozambique women's international footballers